Priya Olivia Serrao (born 22 June 1992) is an Indian-Australian lawyer, public policy and beauty pageant titleholder who was crowned Miss Universe Australia 2019 living in Melbourne. She represented Australia in the Miss Universe 2019 competition.

Early life
Serrao was born in Belmannu, Karnataka, to a Mangalorean Catholic family, and spent most of her early childhood living in Oman and the United Arab Emirates. When she was 11, the family immigrated to Australia and settled in Melbourne and attended high school in the Mac.Robertsons' High School. She has two university degrees: one in arts and one in law from Melbourne Law School. Serrao works as a policy adviser for the Government of Victoria, and was to be admitted to the Supreme Court of Victoria as a lawyer in 2019.

Pageantry
Serrao began her pageantry career at the Miss Universe Australia 2019 competition. She was later selected as one of the national finalists in the competition for the state of Victoria on 10 March 2019. Serrao competed in the final on 27 June 2019, and won, beating first runner-up Bella Kasimba of Western Australia. She then represented Australia in the Miss Universe 2019 competition on 9 December 2019, but was unplaced.

References

 

1992 births
Australian beauty pageant winners
Indian expatriates in Oman
Indian expatriates in the United Arab Emirates
Australian people of Portuguese descent
Indian emigrants to Australia
Living people
Melbourne Law School alumni
Miss Universe Australia winners
Miss Universe 2019 contestants
People from Melbourne
People from Secunderabad
People educated at Mac.Robertson Girls' High School